In ancient Greek religion and mythology, the twelve Olympians are the major deities of the Greek pantheon, commonly considered to be Zeus, Poseidon, Hera, Demeter, Aphrodite, Athena,  Artemis, Apollo, Ares, Hephaestus, Hermes, and either Hestia or Dionysus. They were called Olympians because, according to tradition, they resided on Mount Olympus.

Besides the twelve Olympians, there were many other cultic groupings of twelve gods.

Olympians
The Olympians were a race of deities, primarily consisting of a third and fourth generation of immortal beings, worshipped as the principal gods of the Greek pantheon and so named because of their residency atop Mount Olympus. They gained their supremacy in a ten-year-long war of gods, in which Zeus led his siblings to victory over the previous generation of ruling immortal beings, the Titans, children of the primordial deities Uranus and Gaia. They were a family of gods, the most important consisting of the first generation of Olympians, offspring of the Titans Cronus and Rhea: Zeus, Poseidon, Hera, Demeter and Hestia, along with the principal offspring of Zeus: Aphrodite, 
Athena, Artemis, Apollo, Ares, Hephaestus, Hermes and Dionysus. Although Hades was a major deity in the Greek pantheon and was the brother of Zeus and the other first generation of Olympians, his realm was far away from Olympus in the underworld, and thus he was not usually considered to be one of the Olympians. Olympic gods can be contrasted to chthonic gods including Hades and his wife Persephone, by mode of sacrifice, the latter receiving sacrifices in a bothros ("pit") or megaron ("sunken chamber") rather than at an altar.

The canonical number of Olympian gods was twelve, but besides the (thirteen) principal Olympians listed above, there were many other residents of Olympus, who thus might be considered to be Olympians. Heracles became a resident of Olympus after his apotheosis and married another Olympian resident Hebe. In the Iliad, the goddess Themis, who is listed among the twelve Titans, dwells on Olympus alongside the other gods, making her a Titan and an Olympian at the same time. According to Hesiod, the children of Styx: Zelus (Envy), Nike (Victory), Kratos (Strength), and Bia (Force), "have no house apart from Zeus, nor any dwelling nor path except that wherein God leads them, but they dwell always with Zeus". Some others who might be considered Olympians include the Horae, the Graces, the Muses, Eileithyia, Iris, Dione, and Ganymede.

Twelve gods
Besides the twelve Olympians, there were many other various cultic groupings of twelve gods throughout ancient Greece. According to Thucydides, an altar of the twelve gods was established in the agora of Athens by the archon Pisistratus (son of Hippias and the grandson of the tyrant Pisistratus), around 522 BC. The altar became the central point from which distances from Athens were measured and a place of supplication and refuge.

Olympia apparently also had an early tradition of twelve gods. The Homeric Hymn to Hermes (c. 500  BC) has the god Hermes divide a sacrifice of two cows he has stolen from Apollo, into twelve parts, on the banks of the river Alpheus (presumably at Olympia):

Pindar, in an ode written to be sung at Olympia c. 480 BC, has Heracles sacrificing, alongside the Alpheus, to the "twelve ruling gods":

Another of Pindar's Olympian odes mentions "six double altars". Herodorus of Heraclea (c. 400 BC) also has Heracles founding a shrine at Olympia, with six pairs of gods, each pair sharing a single altar.

Many other places had cults of the twelve gods, including Delos, Chalcedon, Magnesia on the Maeander, and Leontinoi in Sicily. As with the twelve Olympians, although the number of gods was fixed at twelve, the membership varied. While the majority of the gods included as members of these other cults of twelve gods were Olympians, non-Olympians were also sometimes included. For example, Herodorus of Heraclea identified the six pairs of gods at Olympia as: Zeus and Poseidon, Hera and Athena, Hermes and Apollo, the Graces and Dionysus, Artemis and Alpheus, and Cronus and Rhea. Thus, while this list includes the eight Olympians: Zeus, Poseidon, Hera, Athena, Hermes, Apollo, Artemis, and Dionysus, it also contains three clear non-Olympians: the Titan parents of the first generation of Olympians, Cronus and Rhea, and the river god Alpheus, with the status of the Graces (here apparently counted as one god) being unclear.

Plato connected "twelve gods" with the twelve months and implies that he considered Pluto one of the twelve in proposing that the final month be devoted to him and the spirits of the dead.

The Roman poet Ennius gives the Roman equivalents (the ) as six male-female complements, preserving the place of Vesta (Greek Hestia), who played a crucial role in Roman religion as a state goddess maintained by the Vestals.

List
There is no single canonical list of the twelve Olympian gods. The thirteen Greek gods and goddesses, along with their Roman counterparts, most commonly considered to be one of the twelve Olympians are listed below.

Genealogy

See also

 Dii Consentes, the Roman equivalent of the twelve Olympians
 Family tree of the Greek gods
 Interpretatio graeca, including a table of mythological equivalents
 List of Greek mythological characters
 Supreme Council of Ethnikoi Hellenes
 Hellenismos
 Olympia
 Greek mythology in popular culture
 Olympian spirits
 Æsir
 Tuatha Dé Danann

Notes

References
 Burkert, Walter, Greek Religion, Harvard University Press, 1985. .
 Chadwick, John, The Mycenaean World, Cambridge University Press, 1976. .
 Dillon, Matthew, Girls and Women in Classical Greek Religion. London: Routledge. (2002). .
 Dowden, Ken, "Olympian Gods, Olympian Pantheon", in A Companion to Greek Religion, Daniel Ogden editor, John Wiley & Sons, 2010. .
 Gadbery, Laura M., "The Sanctuary of the Twelve Gods in the Athenian Agora: A Revised View", Hesperia 61 (1992), pp. 447–489.
 Gantz, Timothy, Early Greek Myth: A Guide to Literary and Artistic Sources, Johns Hopkins University Press, 1996, Two volumes:  (Vol. 1),  (Vol. 2).
Hansen, William, William F. Hansen, Classical Mythology: A Guide to the Mythical World of the Greeks and Romans, Oxford University Press, 2005. .
 Hard, Robin (2004), The Routledge Handbook of Greek Mythology: Based on H.J. Rose's "Handbook of Greek Mythology", Psychology Press, 2004, . Google Books.
 Herodotus; Histories, A. D. Godley (translator), Cambridge: Harvard University Press, 1920; . Online version at the Perseus Digital Library.
 Hesiod, Theogony, in The Homeric Hymns and Homerica with an English Translation by Hugh G. Evelyn-White, Cambridge, Massachusetts., Harvard University Press; London, William Heinemann Ltd. 1914. Online version at the Perseus Digital Library.
 Homer, The Iliad with an English Translation by A. T. Murray, Ph.D., in two volumes. Cambridge, Massachusetts., Harvard University Press; London, William Heinemann, Ltd. 1924. Online version at the Perseus Digital Library. 
 Homer; The Odyssey with an English Translation by A. T. Murray, Ph.D., in two volumes. Cambridge, Massachusetts., Harvard University Press; London, William Heinemann, Ltd. 1919. Online version at the Perseus Digital Library. , .
 Homeric Hymn to Hermes (4), in The Homeric Hymns and Homerica with an English Translation by Hugh G. Evelyn-White, Cambridge, Massachusetts., Harvard University Press; London, William Heinemann Ltd. 1914. Online version at the Perseus Digital Library.
 Long, Charlotte R., The Twelve Gods of Greece and Rome, Brill Archive, Jan 1, 1987. Google Books.
 Morford, Mark P. O., Robert J. Lenardon, Classical Mythology, Eighth Edition, Oxford University Press, 2007. .
 Müller, Karl Otfried, Ancient Art and Its Remains: Or, A Manual of the Archaeology of Art, translated by John Leitch, B. Quaritch, 1852.
 Ogden, Daniel "Introduction" to A Companion to Greek Religion, Daniel Ogden editor, John Wiley & Sons, 2010. .
 Pache, Corinne Ondine, "Gods, Greek" in The Oxford Encyclopedia of Ancient Greece and Rome, Volume 3, Oxford University Press. 2010. .
 Pindar, Odes, Diane Arnson Svarlien. 1990.
 Plato, Laws in Plato in Twelve Volumes, Vols. 10 & 11 translated by R. G. Bury. Cambridge, Massachusetts, Harvard University Press; London, William Heinemann Ltd. 1967 & 1968. Online version at the Perseus Digital Library.
 Rutherford, Ian, "Canonizing the Pantheon: the Dodekatheon in Greek Religion and its Origins" in The Gods of Ancient Greece: Identities and Transformations, editors Jan N. Bremmer, Andrew Erskine, Edinburgh University Press 2010. . Online version.
 Shapiro, H. A., "Chapter 20: Olympian Gods at Home and Abroad" in A Companion to Greek Art, editors Tyler Jo Smith, Dimitris Plantzos, John Wiley & Sons, 2012. .
 Thomas, Edmund, "From the pantheon of the gods to the Pantheon of Rome" in Pantheons: Transformations of a Monumental Idea, editors Richard Wrigley, Matthew Craske, Ashgate Publishing, Ltd., 2004. .
 Thucydides, Thucydides translated into English; with introduction, marginal analysis, notes, and indices. Volume 1., Benjamin Jowett. translator. Oxford. Clarendon Press. 1881. Online version at the Perseus Digital Library.

 
Twelve Olympians
12 (number)
Olympian deities
Mount Olympus